Torche or TORCHE may refer to:

Torche (band), an American metal band
Torche (album), a 2005 album by Torche
Tory Campaign for Homosexual Equality, a British LGBT conservative organization